Angus Mortimer (born September 4, 1985) is a Canadian former sprint kayaker.  He represented Canada at the 2008 Summer Olympics in Beijing, finishing ninth in the K-4 1000 m event. He won a gold medal in the 2007 Pan American Games K-1 1000m.

Career

In 2005, Mortimer made his World Championship debut as a member of the K-4 that finished 14th over 500m. He won a gold medal in the 2007 Pan American Games K-1 1000m.

While attending Carleton University he paddled out of the Rideau Canoe Club. He represented Canada at the 2008 Summer Olympics in Beijing, finishing ninth in the K-4 1000 m event.

After failing to qualify for the 2012 Summer Olympics and 2016 Summer Olympics, Mortimer retired from paddling to spend more time with his family and coach.

Personal life
His brother, Ian, is also a high-level paddler and Team Canada member in the canoe discipline.

References
Notes

Bibliography
Official Website of Angus Mortimer
The roster for the 2005-2006 Canadian Sprint Canoe and Kayak Team
Canoekayak.ca bio
Canadian Championships 2006 results
Sports-Reference.com profile

1985 births
Sportspeople from Ottawa
Canadian male canoeists
Canoeists at the 2007 Pan American Games
Canoeists at the 2008 Summer Olympics
Carleton University alumni
Living people
Olympic canoeists of Canada
Pan American Games gold medalists for Canada
Pan American Games silver medalists for Canada
Pan American Games medalists in canoeing
Medalists at the 2007 Pan American Games